A video filter is a software component that performs some operation on a multimedia stream. Multiple filters can be used in a chain, known as a filter graph, in which each filter receives input from its upstream filter, processes the input and outputs the processed video to its downstream filter.


With regards to video encoding three categories of filters can be distinguished:
 prefilters: used before encoding
 intrafilters: used while encoding (and are thus an integral part of a video codec)
 postfilters: used after decoding

Prefilters 
Common prefilters include:
 denoising
 resizing (upsampling, downsampling)
 contrast enhancement
 deinterlacing (used to convert interlaced video to progressive video)
 deflicking

Intrafilters 
Common intrafilters include:
 deblocking

Postfilters 
Common postfilters include:
 deinterlacing
 deblocking
 deringing

See also 
 Filter graph

Notes

References 
 Bovik, Al (ed.). Handbook of Image and Video Processing. San Diego: Academic Press, 2000. .
 Wang, Yao, Jörn Ostermann, and Ya-Qin Zhang. Video Processing and Communications. Signal Processing Series. Upper Saddle River, N.J.: Prentice Hall, 2002. .

Video processing
Video signal
Television terminology